Oleksandr Mykolayovych Hladkyi (born 24 August 1987) is a Ukrainian professional footballer who plays as a forward for Chornomorets Odesa. He has also appeared for the Ukraine national team. His last name is variously transliterated into English as Hladkiy, Gladkiy and Gladkyy.

Club career

Kharkiv
Hladkyi began his career in Metalist Kharkiv's football academy, and soon after, the young player was invited to another professional club from the Kharkiv, FC Kharkiv. Under the direction of coach Volodymyr Bessonov, Hladkyi became a regular player for the club and soon established himself as one of the best strikers in the league. His first fame came in the 2006–07 season, when after scoring 13 goals to finish as the Ukrainian league's top scorer.

Shakhtar Donetsk
After this success, Hladkyi attracted the notice of giants Shakhtar Donetsk, and on 8 June 2007, he signed a five-year deal worth €2.5 million with the club. 

On 7 May 2008, in the Ukrainian Cup final, during which he scored and also received a red card, Hladkyi earned the first trophy in his career when Shakhtar defeated rivals Dynamo Kyiv 2–0.

Hladkyi won the 2007–08 Ukrainian Premier League with Shakhtar, but fell one goal short of making Ukrainian Premier League history by being the top goalscorer for two consecutive years. However, with the addition of strikers Yevhen Seleznyov and Marcelo Moreno, and with coach Mircea Lucescu using only one forward in a 4-5-1 formation, Hladkyi had difficulty keeping his spot in the starting line-up or even a place on the bench, leaving his future in doubt. After 10 league games with only 1 win, Shakhtar coach Mircea Lucescu started Hladkyi, who scored in the 28th minute in a 3–0 win over Chornomorets Odessa. Mircea gave Hladkyi another starting opportunity due to an injury to Luiz Adriano, and he scored the third goal in Shakhtar's 4–2 win over FC Kryvbas Kryvyi Rih. Hladkyi scored a winner for Shakhtar against Olexandria in the 93rd minute in a Ukrainian Cup quarter-final, although he also injured his own side's second-choice goalkeeper Rustam Khudzhamov during a collision in the Shakhtar penalty area. He scored his first two UEFA Champions League goals in a historic 3–2 victory in Spain over F.C. Barcelona, ending the latter's streak of 20 games without defeat. As a result of the win, Shakhtar collected more points in the group stage than ever before (9).

Unable to gain a regular place at Shakhtar Donetsk, he transferred to Dnipro Dnipropetrovsk on 17 August 2010.

Shakhtar Donetsk return
In May 2014, Hladkyi departed for FC Shakhtar Donetsk, signing a two-year contract.

Dynamo Kyiv
Upon the expiration of his contract with Shakhtar Donetsk, Hladkyi signed a 3-year contract as a free agent with the Ukrainian champions, Dynamo Kyiv, on 23 May 2016.

Karpaty Lviv
On 2 March 2017 it was officially announced that Hladkyi is being loaned to Karpaty Lviv. It was his second stint in the club over his career. In July 2017 Dynamo has given Hladkyi a status of free agent and he signed a full-fledged contract with Karpaty. While playing for Karpaty in April 2017 he was recognized as a player of the month in the Ukrainian Premier League.

Turkish Super League
Before signing his first contract with foreign club in August 2018 and moving to Turkey, Hladkyi earlier in 2018 spent his time playing for Chornomorets Odesa that struggled to stay in the Ukrainian premiers.

International career
Oleksandr Hladkyi was a regular member of the Ukraine national under-21 football team and scored 6 goals in 12 games. On 22 August 2007, he made his debut for the senior Ukraine national football team in a friendly against Uzbekistan and scored the opening goal, his only goal in 11 matches for Ukraine's senior squad. Since 2007, he has been called up to the main squad by Oleg Blokhin and then Oleksiy Mykhailychenko, but has not appeared for Ukraine since 2015.

Career statistics

Club

International

Scores and results list Ukraine's goal tally first.

Honours
Shakhtar Donetsk
Vyshcha Liha/Ukrainian Premier League: 2007–08, 2009–10
Ukrainian Cup: 2007–08, 2015–16
Ukrainian Super Cup: 2008, 2010, 2014, 2015
UEFA Cup: 2008–09

Dynamo Kyiv
Ukrainian Super Cup: 2016

Individual
Vyshcha Liha Top Scorer: 2006–07 (13 goals)
Vyshcha Liha Top Assist Provider: 2007–08 (11 assists)

See also
 2005 FIFA World Youth Championship squads#Ukraine

References

External links
 
 
 Player Profile at Shakhtar Donetsk Official Website

1987 births
Living people
People from Lozova
Association football forwards
Ukrainian footballers
Ukrainian expatriate footballers
Ukrainian Premier League players
Ukrainian First League players
Ukrainian Second League players
FC Kharkiv players
FC Metalist Kharkiv players
FC Shakhtar Donetsk players
UEFA Cup winning players
FC Dnipro players
FC Karpaty Lviv players
FC Chornomorets Odesa players
Ukraine youth international footballers
Ukraine under-21 international footballers
Ukraine international footballers
Ukrainian Premier League top scorers
FC Dynamo Kyiv players
Süper Lig players
TFF First League players
Çaykur Rizespor footballers
Ukrainian expatriate sportspeople in Turkey
Adana Demirspor footballers
FC Zorya Luhansk players
Sportspeople from Kharkiv Oblast